Diane de Poitiers (9 January 1500 – 25 April 1566) was a French noblewoman and prominent courtier. She wielded much power and influence as King Henry II's royal mistress and adviser until his death. Her position increased her wealth and family's status. She was a major patron of French Renaissance architecture.

Early life
Diane de Poitiers was born on 9 January 1500, in Château de Saint-Vallier, Drôme, France. Her parents were Jean de Poitiers, Seigneur de Saint Vallier, and Jeanne de Batarnay. She became a keen athlete, and kept a fit figure by riding and swimming regularly, remaining in good physical condition for her time.
 
When still a girl, Diane was briefly in the retinue of Princess Anne de Beaujeu, King Charles VIII's eldest sister who skillfully held the regency of France during his minority. Like her fellow charges, Diane was educated according to the principles of Renaissance humanism, including Greek and Latin, rhetoric, etiquette, finance, law, and architecture.

Grand Seneschal of Normandy

On 29 March 1515, at the age of 15, Diane was married to Louis de Brézé, seigneur d'Anet, Count of Maulévrier, and Grand Seneschal of Normandy, who was 39 years her senior. He was a grandson of King Charles VII by his mistress Agnès Sorel and served as a courtier to King Francis I. They had two daughters, Françoise (1518–1574)  and
Louise (1521–1577).

Shortly after her marriage, Diane became lady-in-waiting to Queen Claude of France. After the Queen died, she served in the same capacity to Louise of Savoy, the King's mother, and then Queen Eleanor of Austria. 	
In 1523, her husband uncovered Constable Charles de Bourbon's plot against King Francis I, but did not know at the time that his father-in-law was involved as well. In 1524, Jean de Poitiers was accused of treason and sentenced to death, but his sentence was commuted. He instead was confined to prison until the Treaty of Madrid in 1526.

After her husband died in 1531 in Anet, Diane adopted the habit of wearing black and white for the rest of her life. They were among the permitted colours of mourning and the symbolic colours of the sides of the moon, playing on her name which derived from the Roman moon goddess. She commissioned sculptor Jean Goujon to build 
a tomb for Louis in the Cathedral of Rouen.

Diane's keen interest in financial matters and legal acumen became apparent for the first time during this period. She managed to retain her late husband's emoluments as grand seneschal of Normandy and challenged in court the obligation to return the family's appanages to the royal domain. Impressed, King Francis I allowed the widowed Diane to manage her inherited estates without the supervision of a male guardian and keep their considerable revenues.

Royal favourite

Charles V's troops captured Francis during the battle of Pavia (1525), and in 1526 the princes Francis and Henry were sent to Spain as hostages for their father. Because the ransom was not paid, the two boys (eight and seven at the time) spent nearly four years isolated in a bleak castle. The experience may account for the strong impression that Diane made on Henry, as the very embodiment of the ideal gentlewoman: as his mother was already dead, his grandmother's lady-in-waiting gave him the farewell kiss when he was sent to Spain. At the tournament held in 1531 for the coronation of Francis's new wife, Eleanor of Austria, the Dauphin Francis wore the colors of the new Queen as expected, but Henry wore Diane's colors.

In 1533, Henry married Catherine de' Medici despite opposition to the alliance, since the Medicis were no more than merchant upstarts in the eyes of many in the French court. However, Diane approved of the choice of bride, to whom she was related (Catherine's maternal grandfather and Diane's paternal grandmother being siblings, making them second cousins). Based on allusions in their correspondence, it is generally believed that Diane became his mistress in 1534, when she was 35 years old and Henry was 15. As the couple remained childless and she became concerned by rumours of a possible repudiation of a royal wife that she had in control, Diane made sure that Henry's visits to the marital bedroom would be frequent, to the point that he had ten legitimate children. In another act of self-preservation toward the royal family, Diane helped nurse Catherine back to health when she fell ill.

Despite his occasional affairs with other women, such as Philippa Duci, Janet Fleming, and Nicole de Savigny, Diane remained Henry's lifelong companion. For the next 25 years, she was one of the most powerful women in France. When Francis I was still alive, Diane had to compete at the court with his mistress, Anne de Pisseleu d'Heilly. In 1544, Anne convinced Francis I that Henry (now the Dauphin) and Diane were working to reinstate Constable Montmorency at court. After his father banished Diane, Henry and his supporters retreated to the chateau of Anet; father and son wouldn't reconcile until 1545. After Francis's death, Henry had Anne banned from court and confiscated her duchy of Étampes. By then, Diane's position in the Court was such that when Pope Paul III sent the new Queen the "Golden Rose", he also presented the royal mistress with a pearl necklace. She received the prestigious title of Duchess of Valentinois in 1548 and was made Duchesse d'Étampes in 1553. Through the extensive patron-client network she cultivated, her sons-in-law received important positions.

Although she was not openly involved, Diane's sharp intellect, confident maturity and loyalty to Henry II made her his most dependable ally in the court. He trusted her to write many of his official letters, which were signed jointly with the one name: "HenriDiane". Until 1551, she was in charge of the education of Henry's children, and gave orders to their governors, Jean and Françoise d'Humières. Diane also took care of raising Diane of France (1538 - 1619), natural daughter of Henry and Filippa Ducci, who she treated as if she were her own, to the point that some contemporary chroniclers wrote that Diana was actually the biological mother of the girl. Her daughter Françoise managed the Queen's household as première dame d'honneur (chief lady-in-waiting). The King's adoration for Diane caused a great deal of jealousy on the part of Queen Catherine, particularly when Henry entrusted Diane with the Crown Jewels of France and gave her the Château de Chenonceau, a piece of royal property that Catherine had wanted for herself. However, as long as the King lived, the Queen was powerless to change that.

Construction projects

Most of the sources in Diane's hand are accounts, demonstrating her meticulous attention to finances. She profited from the confiscation of Anne de Pisseleu's estates and managed the lands well, to the point where she became the beneficiary of 300,000 écus. One of the most successful royal mistresses in acquiring wealth, Diane used her income to build castles by commissioning architect Philibert de l'Orme. Making strikingly effective use of Renaissance arts and rhetoric, she constructed an image of herself as a paragon of virtue and presented the image of Henry II as a model of chivalry.

Diane supervised the remodeling of Château d'Anet, her late husband's feudal castle of stone. It has a porch with widely spaced paired ionic columns between towers crowned by pyramidal spires. The château is noted for its exterior, notably the Fountain of Diana, in which the mistress represented the goddess reclining  with her two dogs and stag. There is the mortuary chapel built according to Diane's wishes to contain her tomb, commissioned from architect Claude de Foucques by her daughter Louise, Duchess of Aumale.

Although its ownership remained with the crown until 1555, Diane was the unquestioned mistress of Château de Chenonceau, the jewel of the Loire Renaissance palaces. In 1555, she asked de l'Orme to build the arched bridge joining the château to its opposite bank and oversaw the planting of extensive gardens filled with varieties of fruit trees. Set along the banks of the river, her exquisite gardens were famous and copied.

Later years

Despite wielding such power over the court, Diane's status depended on the King's welfare and remaining in power. In 1559, Henry was critically wounded in a jousting tournament, when his lance wore her favour (ribbon), rather than his wife's. Queen Catherine soon assumed control, restricting access to the royal chambers. Although Henry was alleged to have called out repeatedly for Diane, she wasn't admitted to his deathbed nor invited to his funeral (the latter as was custom and tradition). She was
immediately obliged to give to the Queen Mother the Château de Chenonceau in exchange for the less attractive Château de Chaumont, a punishment much less severe than the ones suffered by other royal mistresses.

Diane lived out her remaining years in her château in Anet, Eure-et-Loir, where she lived in comfortable obscurity as a virtual exile. At the age of 64, she suffered a fall during a ride from which she never fully recovered and died a year later. In accordance with Diane's wishes and to provide a resting place for her, her daughter completed the funeral chapel, built near the castle. During the French Revolution, her tomb was opened, her corpse desecrated, and her remains thrown into a mass grave.
In 1866, Georges Guiffrey published her correspondence. When French experts dug up her remains in 2009, they found high levels of gold in her hair. It is suggested that the "drinkable gold" that she "reportedly" regularly took, believed to preserve youth, may have ultimately killed her. In May 2010, she was reburied at her original tomb in the Château d'Anet.

In popular culture

Novels
 The Two Dianas, by Alexandre Dumas, père
 Courtesan, by Diane Haeger
 La Princesse de Clèves, by Madame de La Fayette
 The Devil's Queen: A Novel of Catherine de Medici, by Jeanne Kalogridis
 Queen's Play and Checkmate, by Dorothy Dunnett
 The Master of All Desires, by Judith Merkle Riley
 Mary Queen of Scots: A Scottish Queen's Diary, France 1553, by Kathryn Lasky
 The Wild Queen: The Days and Nights of Mary, Queen of Scots, by Carolyn Meyer
 The Confessions of Catherine de Medici, by C.W. Gortner
 Royal Road to Fotheringhay and Madame Serpent, by Jean Plaidy
 The Serpent and the Moon, by Princess Michael of Kent (remote descendant of Diane de Poitiers)
 The Ruling Passion, by Alice Acland
 Rival Queens, The Betrayal of Mary, Queen of Scots, by historian Kate William
 Catherine de Medici: Renaissance Queen of France, by Leonie Frieda.

Films
 Diane (1956), portrayed by Lana Turner
 Nostradamus (1994), portrayed by Diana Quick

Television
 Reign (2013), portrayed by Anna Walton
 The Serpent Queen (2022), portrayed by Ludivine Sagnier
Diane de Poitiers (2022), portrayed by  Isabelle Adjani

See also

List of French royal mistresses
Fountain of Diana

References

Sources

Further reading
 
 
 Cloulas, Ivan. (1997). Diane de Poitiers. Fayard.

External links

French king's mistress poisoned by gold elixir
A comprehensive web site about Diane de Poitiers, written by one of her descendants

1499 births
1566 deaths
Duchesses of Valentinois
Diane
Dukes of Valentinois
People from Drôme
Mistresses of Henry II of France
Diane
French ladies-in-waiting
Diane
16th-century French women
Court of Francis I of France
French royal favourites
Dukes of Étampes